Laughing in the Wind is a 2001 Chinese television series produced by Zhang Jizhong, starring Li Yapeng and Xu Qing in the leading roles. The series is an adaptation of Louis Cha's novel The Smiling, Proud Wanderer. It was first broadcast on CCTV in China in 2001.

Cast

 Li Yapeng as Linghu Chong
 Xu Qing as Ren Yingying
 Wei Zi as Yue Buqun
 Miao Yiyi as Yue Lingshan
 Li Jie as Lin Pingzhi
 Chen Lifeng as Yilin
 Lü Xiaohe as Ren Woxing
 Tu Men as Zuo Lengshan
 Liu Dong as Ning Zhongze
 Ba Yin as Xiang Wentian
 Li Qinqin as Abbess Dingyi
 Zang Jinsheng as Monk Bujie
 Yang Kun as Mute Granny
 Feng Xijun as Fangzheng
 Yang Niansheng as Fangsheng / Shangguan Yun
 Peng Denghuai as Yu Canghai
 Yu Chenghui as Feng Qingyang
 Huang Zongluo as Ping Yizhi
 Li Fei as Lan Fenghuang
 Sun Haiying as Tian Boguang
 Xiu Zongdi as Liu Zhengfeng
 Cong Zhijun as Qu Yang
 Liu Zhongyuan as Mo Da
 Zhang Hengping as Lu Bai
 Mao Weitao as Dongfang Bubai
 Niu Baojun as Yang Lianting
 Wang Zhenrong as Taoist Chongxu
 Gong Lifeng as Lu Dayou
 Zhao Fuyu as Lao Denuo
 Zhang Jizhong as Wang Yuanba
 Wang Wensheng as Cheng Buyou
 Qi Zhongkun as Zu Qianqiu
 Han Yipeng as Laotouzi
 Li Qiang as Taoist Tianmen
 Li Qishan as Yujizi
 Li Jingjing as Sang Sanniang
 Yuan Fang as Yihe
 Niu Xingli as Lüzhuweng
 Li Zhonghua as Mu Gaofeng
 Xia Zongxue as Huang Zhonggong
 Wulan Baoyin as Heibaizi
 Yu Hongzhou as Tubiweng
 Bo Shan as Danqingsheng
 Li Zhenping as Lin Zhennan
 Zhao Jian as Fei Bin
 Ding Cuihua as Wang Yuanba's wife
 Zhang Chengwu as Wang Bofen
 Li Yihua as Wang Zhongqiang
 Wei Feng as Tong Baixiong
 Han Fuli as Bao Dachu
 Wang Cheng as Yu Renhao
 Lin Feng as Luo Renjie
 Sun Cundie, Li Xiaobo, Xu Jingyi, Ma Yan, Wang Xinfeng, Ju Xingmao as the Six Immortals of the Peach Valley

International releases
Laughing in the Wind was released in the United States in a four-part DVD volume by Knight Mediacom International in 2005. A 10-DVD box set was released in 2005 in South Korea under the title Swordsman.

External links

Works based on The Smiling, Proud Wanderer
Chinese wuxia television series
2001 Chinese television series debuts
2001 Chinese television series endings
Television series set in Imperial China
Mandarin-language television shows
Television shows based on works by Jin Yong